The De Tomaso Deauville is a luxury four-door saloon first exhibited at the 1970 Turin Motor Show.

The Deauville has an independent rear suspension very similar to that used by Jaguar, and ventilated discs front and aft. It shares its chassis with the Maserati Quattroporte III. A shorter version of its chassis underpinned the Maserati Kyalami and De Tomaso Longchamp grand tourers.

A total of 244 cars were produced.
There were three Deauville variants: the early series 1 (1970–1974: serial number 10##, 11## and 12##), late series 1 (1975–1977: serial numbers 14##) and the series 2 (1978–1985: serial numbers 20## and 21##).

One Deauville station wagon was made for Mr. De Tomaso's wife. There were also two armoured Deauvilles produced, one for the Belgian Royal Family and the other for the Italian government. The latter is on display in the Museo delle Auto della Polizia di Stato in Rome.

2011 concept car

At the 2011 Geneva Motor Show, a newly resurrected De Tomaso marque presented a new model, reviving the use of the name Deauville. The new Deauville is a five-door crossover vehicle with all-wheel drive, which in the detail of its styling quotes models from BMW and Mercedes-Benz, and was designed by Pininfarina.

A sports car and a limousine were soon to follow after the debut of the crossover. The new Deauville never reached production due to arrest of the company chairman on the charges of misappropriation of funds.

Gallery

Notes

External links 

Deauville
Sedans
1980s cars
Cars introduced in 1970
Cars discontinued in 1985